Buckhorn High School may refer to:

Buckhorn High School (New Market, Alabama)
Buckhorn High School (Buckhorn, Kentucky)